Sebelius is a surname. Notable people with the surname include:

 Kathleen Sebelius (born 1948), American politician
 Keith Sebelius (1916–1982), American politician
 K. Gary Sebelius (born 1949), United States magistrate judge

See also 
 Sibelius (disambiguation)